The Kentucky Stickhorses were an American indoor lacrosse team based in Louisville, Kentucky. They were formerly a member of the North American Lacrosse League, before the league's demise after the 2013 season.  The Stickhorses played their home games at Freedom Hall.

History

Founding and the NALL era

The franchise was announced as the fourth of five founding members of the North American Lacrosse League on September 26, 2011, joining the Charlotte Copperheads, Hershey Haymakers, Jacksonville Bullies, and the Wilkes-Barre/Scranton Shamrocks for the inaugural season. However, the league faced legal troubles before playing a single game and split, with the other four members forming the new Professional Lacrosse League. This left the Stickhorses to play an exhibition season in 2012, with all the games being hosted at Freedom Hall.

Reorganized, the NALL returned for the 2013 season with three new full-time members, the Boston Rockhoppers (who participated in two games of the 2012 exhibition season), Baltimore Bombers, and the Rhode Island Kingfish. The league was eager to finally get things going with their first normal season, and the first season where the league was housed in more than one venue. Kentucky struggled in the regular season, posting a 2-6 record, but still found themselves taking on the Rockhoppers in the first ever league championship.

The Stickhorses fell to Boston in a blowout, 26-13, to end the year. However, the league wasn't past all the roadblocks. The Kingfish lost their home arena deal, while the Bombers folded from the league mid-season. The first ever season ended with the league still hanging in the balance. On June 18, 2013 it was official; the NALL had disbanded. Stickhorses owner Anthony Chase wrote an open letter to the fans announcing the end of the team, citing a lack of resources, but hoping that his and the fans' "paths will cross again someday soon."

Roster

2013 season

✝ Games canceled due to Baltimore Bombers mid-season fold.

Season-by-season

† 2012 was only an exhibition season.

See also
 Sports in Louisville, Kentucky

References

External links
 

North American Lacrosse League teams
Defunct sports teams in Louisville, Kentucky
Lacrosse clubs established in 2011
Sports clubs disestablished in 2013
2013 disestablishments in Kentucky
2011 establishments in Kentucky
Lacrosse teams in Kentucky